The digital television transition, also called the digital switchover (DSO), the analogue switch/sign-off (ASO), the digital migration, or the analogue shutdown, is the process in which older analogue television broadcasting technology is converted to and replaced by digital television. Conducted by individual nations on different schedules, this primarily involves the conversion of analogue terrestrial television broadcasting infrastructure to digital terrestrial (DTT), a major benefit being extra frequencies on the radio spectrum and lower broadcasting costs, as well as improved viewing qualities for consumers.

The transition may also involve analogue cable conversion to digital cable or Internet Protocol television, as well as analog to digital satellite television. Transition of land based broadcasting was begun by some countries around 2000. By contrast, transition of satellite television systems was well underway or completed in many countries by this time. It is an involved process because the existing analogue television receivers owned by viewers cannot receive digital broadcasts; viewers must either purchase new digital TVs, or digital converter boxes which have a digital tuner and change the digital signal to an analog signal or some other form of a digital signal (i.e. HDMI) which can be received on the older TV. Usually during a transition, a simulcast service is operated where a broadcast is made available to viewers in both analogue and digital at the same time. As digital becomes more popular, it is expected that the existing analogue services will be removed. In most places this has already happened, where a broadcaster has offered incentives to viewers to encourage them to switch to digital. Government intervention usually involves providing some funding for broadcasters and, in some cases, monetary relief to viewers, to enable a switchover to happen by a given deadline. In addition, governments can also have a say with the broadcasters as to what digital standard to adopt – either DVB-T, ATSC, ISDB-T, or DTMB. Governments can also require all receiving equipment sold in a country to support the necessary digital 'tuner'.

Before digital television, PAL and NTSC were used for both video processing within TV stations and for broadcasting to viewers. Because of this, the switchover process may also include the adoption of digital equipment using serial digital interface (SDI) on TV stations, replacing analogue PAL or NTSC component or composite video equipment. Digital broadcasting standards are only used to broadcast video to viewers; Digital TV stations usually use SDI irrespective of broadcast standard, although it might be possible for a station still using analogue equipment to convert its signal to digital before it is broadcast, or for a station to use digital equipment but convert the signal to analogue for broadcasting, or they may have a mix of both digital and analogue equipment. Digital TV signals require less transmission power to be broadcast and received satisfactorily.

The switchover process is being accomplished on different schedules in different countries; in some countries it is being implemented in stages as in Australia, Greece, India or Mexico, where each region has a separate date to switch off. In others, the whole country switches on one date, such as the Netherlands. On 3 August 2003, Berlin became the world's first city to switch off terrestrial analogue signals. Luxembourg was the first country to complete its terrestrial switchover, on 1 September 2006.

Background and timeline

Transition dates

 1996: Netherlands (satellite services)
 1998: United Kingdom (digital terrestrial service)
 1999: Russia (satellite services)
 2001: United Kingdom/Ireland (satellite services), Malaysia (cable television)
 2002: Faroe Islands, Malaysia (satellite services), Albania (satellite services), Norway (satellite services)
 2004: Sweden (satellite services)
 2005: Italy (satellite services), Indonesia (satellite services)
 2006: Turkey (satellite services), China (satellite services), Luxembourg, Netherlands
 2007: Finland, Andorra, Sweden, Switzerland
 2008: Germany, Belgium (Flanders)
 2009: United States (full power stations and satellite services), Isle of Man, Denmark, Norway 
 2010: Belgium (Wallonia), Croatia, Estonia, Guernsey, Jersey, Japan (northeastern Ishikawa Prefecture only), Latvia, Luxembourg (cable television and satellite), San Marino, Slovenia, Spain, United Kingdom (Wales)
 2011: Austria, Canada (major markets), Cyprus, France, Israel, Japan (except 2011 Tōhoku earthquake-affected prefectures), Malta, Monaco, United Kingdom (Scotland)
 2012: Czech Republic, Gibraltar, Germany (satellite services), Ireland (terrestrial), Italy, Japan (Fukushima, Iwate, Miyagi Prefectures), Lithuania, Saudi Arabia, Qatar, United Arab Emirates, Jordan, Bahrain, Portugal, Slovakia, South Korea, Taiwan, United Kingdom (England and Northern Ireland), Vatican City
 2013: Australia (including Christmas Island, Cocos (Keeling) Islands), Azerbaijan, Bulgaria, Hungary, North Macedonia, Mauritius, New Zealand, Poland, United Kingdom (cable television)
 2014: Serbia, Iceland, Namibia, Algeria
 2015: Belarus, Brunei, Greece, Iran, Morocco (UHF band), Mexico, Moldova, Romania (UHF band), Rwanda, Kenya, Uganda, Ghana, Armenia, Georgia, United States (class A low-power stations), Mongolia
 2016: Bermuda, Brazil (Federal District and the city of Rio Verde, Goiás), Chile, China (CCTV), Burundi
 2017: Brazil (a few metropolitan areas, such as São Paulo and Rio de Janeiro, among others), Philippines (Light Network), Romania (phase 2), Germany Unitymedia, Kyrgyzstan, Brunei
 2018: United States (cable television), Brazil (major markets, including all markets in Rio de Janeiro, São Paulo states), Romania (VHF band), Russia (first two multiplex channels) (Tver Region), Thailand (most channels), Ukraine (most channels), Uzbekistan, Philippines (RJ TV/2nd Avenue, Net 25 and 3ABN/Hope Channel Philippines)
 2019: Ireland (cable television), Russia (first two multiplex channels) (more regions), Northern Cyprus, Singapore, India (phase one), Moldova (Transnistria), Bhutan (cable television), Peru (Lima and Callao), Costa Rica, Malaysia (terrestrial), Philippines (ETC/SBN 21)
 2020: Brazil (other markets), Morocco (VHF band), Hong Kong, Thailand (Channel 3), Venezuela, Moldova (Other territories), Sudan, Côte d'Ivoire, Vietnam, Laos, Pakistan, Senegal, South Africa
 2021: Dominican Republic, China (regional stations), United States (fully-power stations except in Alaska), India, Bolivia (phase two), Colombia, Kazakhstan, Paraguay, Panama (Panamá, Colón and Panamá Oeste)
 2022: Botswana (remaining localities), Canada (remaining markets), El Salvador, Indonesia (terrestrial),  Philippines (BEAM TV and SMNI), Argentina (Buenos Aires, southern provinces), United States (fully-power stations in Alaska); Russia/Ukraine (final phase)
 2023: Cambodia (remaining markets), Jamaica, Pakistan, Philippines (remaining markets), India (last phase), Peru (rest of the country), Argentina (rest of the country), South Africa
 2024: Brazil (rural areas), Chile, Cuba
 2025: Bolivia
 2026: Trinidad and Tobago
 Multiple dates: Ethiopia, Angola, Mozambique, DR Congo

Different standards have been developed for the broadcast transmission of digital terrestrial television, comparable to the older analog standards they replace: NTSC, PAL and SECAM. Broadcasters around the world choose and adopt one of these to be the format and technology behind the transmission. The standards are:
The European-made DVB-T, adopted by most of Europe, Africa, Asia and Oceania
The American-made ATSC, adopted by much of the Americas and some of Asia and Oceania
The Japanese-made ISDB-T, adopted by some in Asia, most of South America, and a few in Africa
The Chinese-made DTMB, adopted by some in Asia and a few in Africa and the Americas

2006 Geneva Agreement
The "RRC-06" agreement in Geneva (hosted by the International Telecommunication Union (ITU)) was signed by delegates from many countries, including most of Europe, Africa and Asia. The agreement set 17 June 2015 as the date after which countries may use frequencies currently assigned for analog television transmission for digital services (specifically DVB-T), without being required to protect the analog services of neighbouring countries against interference. This date was generally viewed as an internationally mandated analog switch-off date, at least along national borders—except for those operating on the VHF band which would be allowed until 17 June 2020.

These deadlines set by the agreement have been difficult to reach in certain regions, like in Africa where most countries missed the 2015 deadline, as well as South East Asia. High upgrade costs are often a reason cited for the slow transition in those regions.

The European Commission, on a different note, had recommended on 28 October 2009 that digital switchover should be completed by 1 January 2012.

Digital-to-analog converters

Analog-only TVs are incapable of receiving over-the-air broadcasts without the addition of a set-top converter box. Consequently, a digital converter box – an electronic device that connects to an analog television – must be used to allow the television to receive digital broadcasts. In the United States, the government subsidized the purchase of such boxes for consumers via their coupon-eligible converter box program in 2009, funded by a small part of the billions of dollars brought in by a spectrum auction. The program was managed by the Department of Commerce through its National Telecommunications and Information Administration.

Televisions with integrated digital tuners have been available for a considerable time. This means that a set-top box is usually no longer necessary with a new TV set.

Satellite and cable
Satellite broadcasting switched to digital much earlier than terrestrial broadcasting. The switchover process is much easier for satellite since only changes to the earth station equipment are needed on the transmission side and consumers are already used to having a set top box/decoder. In many places, the satellite switchover was complete before terrestrial switchover was even started. Cable on the other hand would switch off months, if not years after terrestrial would.

In countries where terrestrial is little used, the migration to digital satellite or cable is more realized. For instance, in Switzerland or the UAE, where terrestrial has low usage, the terrestrial switchover was not noticed by the general population. But in countries where terrestrial is the dominant method of watching TV, like Japan, Spain or Thailand, the switchover is a big deal as it affects the majority of the population.

Terrestrial digital switchover by country, at a glance

Transitions completed

ITU Region 1

Africa
 : Digital broadcasting started in 2009, analog signals were switched off on 10 November 2014.
  started transitioning to digital in the early 2010s. The analog switch off happened to complete at the end of 2019.
 : The switchover is complete.
  had turned off all analog signals on 17 June 2016.
 : Analog switch-off occurred in June 2015, switching to DVB-T.
 : Launched its DTV service from the Centre Émetteur D'Abobo site in Abidjan on 8 February 2019. Côte d'Ivoire completed the migration to DTT in June 2020.
 : After DTT launched in 2008, analog switch off was supposed to take place in 2013, however media houses challenged the move in court and the switch off was since moved to 31 December 2014 for the metropolitan areas and their surroundings while in the rest of the country switched to DVB-T2 in March 2015.
 : The switchover is complete.
  7 multiplexes of DVB-T2 were available in Tripoli in 2012. Analog television was turned off on 13 February 2020.
 : The switchover is complete.
 : First digital (DVB-T) broadcasts commenced 30 September 2005. Analog shut off on 17 June 2014.
 : The first African country to go digital when it launched DTT in February 2005. Analog signals were terminated on 13 September 2014.
 : Shut off the last of its analog signals in March 2014. Switched to DVB-T, with plans to upgrade to DVB-T2 in the future.
  is broadcasting a number of multiplexes in DVB-T2 (SD & HD) from Sudan TV since late 2015. A single analogue UHF channel remains. Analog television was  turned off on 13 February 2020.
 : Shut off the last of its analog signals in July 2014. Switched to DVB-T2
 began digital broadcasts in 2003, using DVB-T, then since 2015, using DVB-T2. Analog television was turned off on 13 February 2021.
 : Shut off analog signals in 2015.
 : Analog shut off on 31 December 2014. Switched to DVB-T2.

Europe and CIS
 : The original analog switch-off deadline was planned for July 2015, however this was missed because of multiple problems. Analog channels were first shut off on 10 September 2018 in the areas of Durrës and Tirana, but they were restored later in the day because the supply of DVB-T2 decoders was not enough to cover the demand. The date was then postponed to January 2019 and finally October 2019. On 1 October 2019 analog broadcasts were shut off in most areas, including Tirana and Durrës. A few channels switched off their transmissions a few days later. Report TV was the last to keep the warning screen on air. The date for cities like Elbasan was set for March 2020, the transmissions still being receivable in Tirana with a big enough aerial. Areas like Dibër, Gjirokastër, Vlora and Saranda remained on air with the switch-off date being postponed multiple times. Albania finally completed the transition on 29 December 2020 with the last analog broadcast being in Gjirokastër by Klan TV. Analog satellite broadcasts stopped in 2002 shortly before the introduction of digital satellite.
  completed its switch-off on Tuesday 25 September 2007.

 : Shut down analog signals on 10 July 2015.
 : Began analog switch-off on Monday, 5 March 2007, progressing from the west to the east. The analog broadcast was shut down nationwide at the end of 2010 regarding the main transmitters. The last analog translators were switched off on 7 June 2011.
 : Began analog switch-off on Sunday, 17 October 2010, completed on 17 June 2015.
 : Analogue broadcasting was disabled 15 May 2015 in the UHF band and 16 June 2015 in the VHF band (channels 6–12). The final analogue switch-off occurred at 4 January 2016.
 : Media regulations are under regional legislation. Flanders switched off analog television on Monday 3 November 2008, while in Wallonia, all analog services were switched off on Monday, 1 March 2010, making the country completely serviced by digital signal. However, analog cable is still used by many cable subscribers, so therefore a cable switchover is unlikely to happen in the near future.
 : Bulgaria launched a free-to-air platform in the Sofia region, starting in November 2004. The Communications Regulatory Commission (CRC)  said that it received six bids for the licence to build and operate Bulgaria's two nationwide DTT networks. A second licence tender for the operation of three DTT multiplexes was open until 27 May 2009. Following the closing of this process, Hannu Pro, part of Silicon Group, and with Baltic Operations secured the license to operate three DTT multiplexes in Bulgaria by the country's Communications Regulatory Commission (CRC) Bulgaria completed the transition to digital broadcasting in September 2013.

 : Analog television broadcasts were switched off for all national TV channels on Tuesday 5 October 2010 at 12:35 and for local TV channels on Saturday 20 November 2010.
  terminated all analog transmissions on Thursday 30 June 2011 and moved to digital-only transmissions in MPEG-4 on Friday 1 July 2011.
: Broadcaster BRT halted analog signals on 31 March 2019, replaced by DVB-T which started testing in the country in 2009.

 : The last analog retransmitters in the south-east Moravia and the northern Moravia – Silesia were switched off on Saturday, 30 June 2012.
  switched off all terrestrial analog services at midnight on Sunday 1 November 2009. Analogue cable was switched off on 9 February 2016. Analogue satellite was terminated by 2006 when DR 2 and TV3 ended their analogue signals on the Intelsat 10-02/Thor satellite at 0.8°W. DR 2 was the last ever broadcast using the D2-MAC standard when it closed on 1 July.

  launched DTT in December 2002. Most of the analogue signals were switched off immediately.
 's analog television was switched off completely on Thursday, 1 July 2010.

  ceased analog terrestrial transmissions nationwide at 04:00, Saturday, 1 September 2007 (the switch-off was previously planned for midnight but a few extra hours were added for technical reasons). This was controversial, as the cost of a digital TV set in Finland at the time was heavily criticised and saw a substantial decrease in how much the television license cost. Cable TV viewers continued to receive analog broadcasts until the end of February 2008.
  switched off all analog services (terrestrial, satellite and cable) on Tuesday, 29 November 2011. This included overseas departments and territories such as Guadeloupe, French Guiana, Martinique, Mayotte, Réunion, French Polynesia, New Caledonia, Saint Barthelemy, Saint Martin, Saint Pierre and Miquelon, and Wallis and Futuna.
 : Analog broadcasts should have been switched off 17 June 2015, but due to the flooding in Tbilisi, which occurred on the night of 13 to 14 June 2015 analogue switch-off happened on 1 July 2015.
  started the switch-off in the Berlin area, beginning on Friday, 1 November 2002 and completing on Monday 4 August 2003 becoming the first city to do so. "Simulcast" digital transmissions started in other parts of the country in an effort to prepare for a full switchover. The switch-off of terrestrial analog transmitters was completed on Tuesday 25 November 2007, except one main transmitter in Bad Mergentheim, which was shut down in June 2009. Analog satellite receivers were still used by 6% of households in 2010 – the highest in Europe. The analog satellite transmissions (broadcasting on Astra 19.2°E) were switched off on Monday 30 April 2012, being the last in Europe. However, analog cable is still used by about 30% of the population and 55% of all cable broadcasts. The cable TV provider Unitymedia switched off analog cable on 27 June 2017.
 : Digital broadcasting of privately owned nationwide TV channels began by Digea in Greece on 24 September 2009, covering a large section of the Corinthian gulf in northern Peloponnese. During the 2009–2013 transition period, a total of 13 digital broadcasting centers were activated throughout Greece, covering approximately 70% of the Greek population. Analog terrestrial transmissions were first terminated at the Peloponnese region on 27 June 2014. Five more switch-offs followed in 2014 and the analog shutdown was completed on Friday, 6 February 2015. Α total of 156 broadcasting centres are currently active throughout the country, covering over 96% of the country's population.
 : Hungarian analog terrestrial transmissions officially stopped on Thursday, 31 October 2013, after completing two phases that ended on 31 July and 31 October, respectively. However, analog transmissions are still operating as of August 2021 on cable systems, at least.
 : All analog terrestrial transmissions were switched off on Monday, 2 February 2015.
 : Digital terrestrial television was launched in Ireland as Saorview on Friday 29 October 2010. At launch it had five standard-definition channels and one high-definition channel. The analog service was terminated on Wednesday 24 October 2012 and was replaced by a second multiplex for Saorview. A small number of low power independent analog re-broadcast systems remained licensed until 31 December 2012. Analogue cable was shut down on 8 April 2019. Analogue satellite from Astra 19.2°E was discontinued on 27 September 2001.
 : The conversion to digital television progressed region–by–region. It started in Sardinia on 15 October 2008, and was completed on Wednesday 4 July 2012, when the last analog transmitters in the Province of Palermo were shut down. The switchover was politically controversial due to a 2004 law that seemed to favor Mediaset, owned by the Prime Minister Silvio Berlusconi, in the television market. A 2006 bill proposed by Paolo Gentiloni passed the government of Romano Prodi that would make one of Mediaset's channels as well as one from public broadcaster RAI move to digital three years before the switch. The bill was called "tailored for political revenge" by Berlusconi. In 2011 the European Court of Justice ruled that the digital switchover in Italy was illegally subsidised favoring Berlusconi's media group. Analogue satellite broadcasts were switched off from the Hot Bird 13°E satellite on 29 April 2005 by RAI.
 : The shutdown of analog broadcasting began on 1 December 2018, the first two regions turned off: Jambyl and Mangystau Regions, On 1 July 2019, Nine more regions were disconnected: South Kazakhstan, Atyrau, Kyzylorda, Almaty Regions, East Kazakhstan, Pavlodar, North Kazakhstan, Kostanay and Karaganda Regions. And on 1 July 2021 (the final stage), the last five regions were disconnected: West Kazakhstan, Akmola, Aktobe Regions, Nur-Sultan and Almaty.
 : DTT services rolled out officially in 2014, and the transition to digital ended in 2017.
 's analog television completely converted to digital broadcasting on Tuesday 1 June 2010.
 : The switch-off of the analog terrestrial transmissions was completed on Monday, 29 October 2012.
  shut down their last analog transmitter on UHF Channel 21 on Friday 31 December 2010.
 : Launched its first DTT service in November 2016. Analog broadcasts were discontinued from 1 March 2020. The process was somewhat difficult due to the high costs of upgrading to digital.
  DTT based on DVB-T started broadcasting on 30 December 2012 but only in testing phase until 2015. The DVB-T2 public rollout commenced in April 2016. Analog broadcasts for Transnistria shut down in the period 2018–2019.
 : Analog transmissions were terminated on Saturday, 1 June 2013.
  terminated all analog services on Monday, 31 October 2011. The switch-off was originally planned for Wednesday 1 June 2011 but was delayed for unknown reasons.
  switched off their analog TV broadcasts on Tuesday 24 May 2011.
 : Shut down analog signals on 17 June 2015.
  moved to digital-only terrestrial broadcasting on Monday, 11 December 2006, being the second country to do so. The switch-off was noticed by few, since the overwhelming majority receive TV via cable and only around 74,000 households relied on terrestrial over-the-air broadcasts. The switch-off was helped greatly as cable continued to use analog distribution, and thus consumers' old tuners continued to be useful. In March 2018, major cable provider Ziggo announced that it would gradually phase out analogue cable TV transmissions in the next two years. Analogue satellite transmissions from Astra 19.2°E were halted on 18 August 1996, just two months after digital was introduced. This was felt by few people, however, due to low satellite usage.
 : The switch-off of the analog transmissions started in March 2008 and was completed on Tuesday 1 December 2009. Norway started its DTT service on the Saturday 1 September 2007. Analog satellite broadcasts of NRK and TV 2 on the Thor 4.3°W satellite ended on 15 October 2002.
 : Terrestrial television in Poland is broadcast using a digital DVB-T system. First test DVB-T emission was carried in Warsaw at 9 November 2001. In April 2004, first DVB-T transmitter near Rzeszów started operation, and local TVP division started to market set-top boxes allowing to receive it. The shutdown of analog broadcasts took place in 7 steps from 7 November 2012 to 23 July 2013 when analog terrestrial transmissions were completely terminated. Analog broadcasts on satellite ended when TVN stopped its analog transmission on the Hot Bird 13°E satellite in 2008. 
 : Digital terrestrial broadcasts started on Wednesday 29 April 2009. Portugal's government hoped to cover 80% of the territory with digital terrestrial TV by the end of 2009, and simulcasts remained until Thursday 26 April 2012, when the analog broadcasting ended. This switchover began on Thursday 12 January 2012. Analog cable is still available from all pay-TV providers (including fiber), for homes with multiple televisions. There are no plans in place to switch-off analog cable. The digital versions of all channels have traditionally been encrypted and could only be accessed with a proprietary set-top-box, which subscribers had to pay for with a monthly fee. Starting in October 2017, cable provider NOS unencrypted the digital versions of its base channels, enabling them to be tuned directly by televisions with support for MPEG-4 (or digital terrestrial) or any freely available digital tuner. Channels belonging to subscription packs, as well as premium channels, still require a proprietary set top box to be viewed. Other pay-TV providers – Vodafone, NOWO and Meo – similarly no longer encrypt the digital versions of their base channels.
  has one of the highest pay-TV penetration rates in Europe, with over 98% of homes receiving cable or satellite TV services. Also over 90% of population are covered with DVB-T2 digital terrestrial television signal. The last analog transmitters were switched off on 1 May 2018 when TVR decided to order the shut down due to low demand and high operating costs.
 : On 22 December 2018, Russia completed the creation of the world's largest digital television broadcasting system, with 10,080 transmitters operating at 5,040 sites throughout the country. On 3 December 2018, analog transmissions were switched off in the Tver Region including the city of Tver. Analog transmissions in Ryazan, Tula, Yaroslavl, Ulyanovsk, Penza, Magadan, and Chechnya ended on 11 February 2019, while those in 20 other regions which includes Moscow and the Moscow Region were switched off on 15 April 2019. On 3 June 2019, analog transmissions in 36 regions were discontinued which include the oblasts of Vladimir, Samara, Nizhny Novgorod, Krasnoyarsk and Oryol. Switchover in the last 21 regions was completed on 14 October 2019. The regions include St. Petersburg, the Leningrad Region, the Republic of Crimea and Sevastopol. Channels that are not offered as multiplex services (i.e. some federal and regional channels) are still broadcast in analog.

  completed its switch-off on Thursday 2 December 2010.
  launched its first DTT transmissions in 2005. The first DTT-only channel was made available in 2008. As of 2013, the DVB-T2 network covers Belgrade and much of Vojvodina, several cities in Šumadija and Western Serbia and the southern city of Niš. Digital TV switchover for 98% of citizens started on 1 September 2014. Transition progressed in six stages. First switchoff took place in Vršac on 15 April 2015. Last switchoff took place on 7 June 2015.
 : Slovakia finished analog transmission broadcasts on Monday, 31 December 2012.
 : The switch-off of main transmitters was completed on Wednesday 1 December 2010. The last local analog transmitters were switched off on Thursday 30 June 2011.
 
 : The switch-off of the analog terrestrial transmissions was completed on Saturday 3 April 2010. The switch-off was successful, as about 70% of Spanish television transmissions are terrestrial, so it was easy for people to just switch to the digital signal. Spain started its DTT service on Wednesday 30 November 2005.
 : The switch-off of the analog terrestrial network progressed region–by–region. It started on the island of Gotland on Monday, 19 September 2005, and was completed on Monday 15 October 2007, when the last analog SVT1 transmitters in Blekinge and western Scania were shut down. Cable broadcasters continue to broadcast in analog. Analog broadcasts from the Sirius and Thor satellites were ended by April 2004.
  (including ) began with the switch-off on Monday 24 July 2006 in Ticino and continued with Engadin on Monday 13 November 2006. The switch-off was completed on Monday 26 November 2007. A very high percentage of Swiss viewers receive their signals via cable distributors. By 2012 40% of cable viewers had switched to digital. Analog cable was switched off on 1 January 2017. The country switched off its terrestrial network entirely in 2019 due to low penetration.
 : Digital terrestrial broadcasting began in the UK on Sunday 15 November 1998 with the launch of the ONdigital, later renamed ITV Digital and now Freeview. The transition from analogue and digital to digital-only terrestrial signals started on Wednesday 17 October 2007 with the Whitehaven transmitter in Cumbria, and followed a transmitter switchover timetable, implemented by region. The first constituent country to switch off all its analogue signals was Wales on Wednesday 31 March 2010 and the last region to switch off its analogue signals was Northern Ireland on Wednesday 24 October 2012. Analogue cable broadcasts eventually ended and fully ceased, on 28 November 2013, when Milton Keynes finally saw their service terminate, after a settling of a cable ownership dispute between BT Group and Virgin Media. Analogue satellite from the Astra 19.2E satellite was discontinued on Thursday 27 September 2001. Sales of analog TV sets stopped on 6 July 2010.
 Analogue transmissions ceased in December 2012 (replaced by DVB-T Gibraltar Freeview) 
 switched off all analogue services on Thursday 16 July 2009 
 and  switched off their analogue signals on Wednesday 17 November 2010.

 : The launch of digital broadcasting began on 15 January 2018. The first regions to turn off their analogue broadcasts were Andijan, Fergana, Namangam and Tashkent Region. On 15 July 2018, the switchoff was completed on the city of Tashkent, and on 5 December 2018, the shutdown of analog television in Uzbekistan was completed.
 : Digital transition completed in 2012.

Middle East

 : The analog terrestrial transmissions were terminated on 13 February 2012 and was replaced by a multiplex for Nilesat. The government plans to shut off analog cable by 31 March 2023. Bahrain was transitioning from using MPEG-2 to MPEG-4 for its terrestrial broadcasts, a process which began on 26 August 2012. Bahrain adopted DVB-T2 in March 2013. Analog satellite transmission were switched off on 1 March 2004.
 : started digital transmissions in MPEG-4 on 2 August 2009 and analog transmissions ended on 31 March 2011. A second MUX in DVB-T2 was launched in August 2015.
 : The analog terrestrial transmissions were terminated on 13 February 2012 and was replaced by a multiplex for Nilesat. The government plans to shut off analog cable by 31 March 2023. Qatar was transitioning from using MPEG-2 to MPEG-4 for its terrestrial broadcasts, a process which began on 26 August 2012. Qatar adopted DVB-T2 in February 2013. Analog satellite transmission were switched off on 1 March 2004. Digital television launched terrestrially throughout the Arab world on 1 January 2001 (known as Nilesat).
 : The analog terrestrial transmissions were terminated on 13 February 2012 and was replaced by a multiplex for Nilesat. The government plans to shut off analog cable by 31 March 2023. Saudi Arabia was transitioning from using MPEG-2 to MPEG-4 for its terrestrial broadcasts, a process which began on 26 August 2012. Saudi Arabia adopted DVB-T2 in March 2013. Analog satellite transmission were switched off on 1 March 2004.
 : The analog terrestrial transmissions were terminated on 13 February 2012 and was replaced by a multiplex for Nilesat. The government plans to shut off analog cable by 31 March 2023. United Arab Emirates were transitioning from using MPEG-2 to MPEG-4 for its terrestrial broadcasts, a process which began on 26 August 2012. United Arab Emirates adopted DVB-T2 in February 2013. Analog satellite transmission were switched off on 1 March 2004. Digital television launched terrestrially throughout Arab world on 1 January 2001 (known as Nilesat).

ITU region 2 (Americas)
 : The Bermuda Broadcasting Company terminated terrestrial NTSC-M broadcasts in March 2016. ZFB-TV (analog channel 7) and ZBM-TV (analog channel 9), the two television stations in Bermuda, switched to digital channels 20.1 and 20.2, respectively. Like its parent nation (the United Kingdom) and unlike the United States, Canada, and the Bahamas (which have been transitioning to ATSC), Bermuda switched over to DVB-T.
 : Canada's DTV transition was completed in 28 mandatory markets on Wednesday, 31 August 2011. Some CBC analog transmitters in mandatory markets were permitted to operate for another year, and transmitters outside mandatory markets were given the option of converting to digital, or remaining in analog. The CBC decided to shut down all (more than 600) of its remaining analog transmitters on Tuesday, 31 July 2012, without replacing them. Also on 31 August 2011, all full-power TV transmitters had to vacate channels 52 to 69. There was a very small number of community-based transmitters broadcasting in analogue, which were shut down no later than 2022; see Digital television in Canada.
 : The transition is complete. The country was scheduled to shut down analog signals permanently in December 2018 but this was changed to 15 August 2019.
  has digital TV through KTV and British Forces Broadcasting Service, which since the early 2010s now exclusively broadcast digitally.
  launched digital services in Nuuk in August 2002. The last settlement that upgraded to digital was Siorapaluk in 2012, with analogue switched off in October.
 : First phase began on 31 December 2016, second phase was completed on 31 December 2019. The whole country is now entirely covered by DTV.
 : Digital broadcasts started in 2000, with the first being Tijuana's XETV – an English-language television station that primarily served San Diego, California between the 1960s and the early 2010s. Analog shutdown was originally scheduled to occur in 2012, but on Thursday, 2 September 2010, Mexican government advanced the analog shutdown from 2012 to 2015. From 2013, areas began to be switched over regionally depending on the presence of digital terrestrial stations and a campaign headed by the SCT to distribute free television converters to households on the government welfare rolls. The first digital switchover was to begin on Tuesday, 28 May 2013 in Tijuana, but was postponed to 18 July due to the 2013 Baja California state elections. The switchover was completed nationwide on 31 December 2015, when all remaining analog television stations left the air. Mexico then instituted a nationwide remapping of network stations in late 2015 requiring most of them to map to the channel number in either Mexico City, or for regional networks, the main metro area served by the network's flagship station.
  adopted the ATSC standard for DTT and completed the analog switch off in 2015.

 : A deadline for transition to digital broadcasting was set as 17 February 2009; this deadline was extended and performed instead on 12 June 2009. Exceptions to the 12 June deadline included low-power stations, and "nightlight" stations which broadcast PSAs on the transition until 12 July 2009. Class A low-power stations were then required to transition to digital by 1 September 2015. The low-power and translator station deadline was suspended on 24 April 2015, due to concerns that the then-upcoming 600 MHz spectrum auction could "potentially displace a significant number of LPTV and TV translator stations", and would "[require] analog stations to incur the costs of transitioning to digital before completion of the auction and repacking process". After the auction's completion in 2017, the FCC announced 13 July 2021 as the new analog low-power shutoff date. On 21 June 2021, the FCC granted the State of Alaska an extension due to novel factors that prevented the completion of stations digital facilities, setting a new low-power analog shutoff date of 10 January 2022.
 Complied with the FCC transition to ATSC digital on 12 June 2009 on all full-power stations.
 Complied with the FCC transition to ATSC digital on 12 June 2009 on all full-power stations.

ITU region 3

Asia
 : Military broadcaster BFBS operates fully on digital.
 : The country selected the standard of DVB-T2 with first launch in 2014. Full transition to digital terrestrial television broadcasting were completed on 31 December 2017.
 : China started its transition to digital television in 2003, with cable and satellite television using DVB and terrestrial television using DTMB. Analog satellite television ended on 31 March 2006, after the last satellite television channels on Apstar-1A, including Zhejiang Television, switched to digital, in which time the legal holders of satellite television receivers were limited to regional cable television providers, thus China never actually has the analog satellite television service provided to the masses. Analog cable television services were largely discontinued in the late 2000s and early 2010s. On 14 May 2016, all channels of China Central Television, the country's state broadcaster, converted to digital broadcasting in a 4-step conversion. Regional television broadcasters also began converting to digital. Analog terrestrial television analogue nationwide broadcasting officially ended from 31 March 2021 at 23:59 CST.
 : Transitioned to digital television as part of Australia's transition to digital television.  In line with Regional and Remote Western Australia, analogue TV simulcasts would have ended by 25 June 2013.
 : Transitioned to digital television as part of Australia's transition to digital television.  In line with Regional and Remote Western Australia, analogue TV simulcasts would have ended by 25 June 2013.
 : The original digital switchover plan from PAL to DTMB was supposed to take place in 2012. After being postponed multiple times, analogue broadcasting officially ended from 30 November 2020 at 23:59 HKT, when all analogue transmissions turned off. A total of 160,000 lower-income households also received subsidies from the government to buy digital television sets or a set-top box to get a digital signal following the transition.

 : Digital terrestrial television was launched on 21 December 2010 (by DVB-T) and 20 November 2013 (by DVB-T2). Following legalization of Act No. 11 of 2020 on Job Creation on 2 December 2020, the Ministry of Communication and Information Technology (Kemenkominfo) through its minister Johnny G. Plate announced that 2 November 2022 would be the last analogue switchover date for the migration to digital television under DVB-T2 system. On 12 May 2021, the government of Indonesia announced that the analogue switch off would be implemented gradually in much simplified three stages to accelerate the migration. The first analog shutdown occurred in few areas on 30 April 2022, followed by another areas on 24 September 2022. Analog broadcasting station in Jakarta along with 173 regencies/cities non-terrestrial services was officially turned off on 2 November 2022 at 11:59:59pm (except ANTV, RCTI, MNCTV, GTV and iNews on 3 November 2022). Batam, Bandung, Semarang, Surakarta and Yogyakarta followed on 2 December 2022; Surabaya on 20 December 2022; Medan and Makassar on 10 January 2023; Banjarmasin on 20 March 2023; and Bali and Palembang on 31 March 2023.

 : The analog shutdown began on 24 July 2010 in Suzu, Ishikawa as a pilot experiment. Analog terrestrial television transmissions in the remainder of Ishikawa Prefecture and 43 other prefectures, as well as analog Broadcast Satellite and Wowow services, ended at noon on Sunday, 24 July 2011, along with the analog satellite services; three remaining prefectures (Fukushima, Iwate, and Miyagi) that suffered heavy damage in the 11 March 2011 9.0 magnitude Tohoku earthquake and its related nuclear accidents stopped analog broadcasting at noon on Saturday, 31 March 2012. In both of those cases, the analog transmitters themselves were switched off at midnight on the same day. Analog high-definition television broadcasting ended on Sunday, 30 September 2007. An analog cable service (known as Dejiana since 1 July 2011) continued to be broadcast, but starting on 1 April 2012, all cable providers in Japan were required to convert from analog to digital services. Most analog cable services were terminated between 24 July 2011 and April 2015. All television stations across the country now broadcast only in digital, ending an analog-digital simulcast period that began on Monday, 1 December 2003 in the Kantō region (which expanded to all other prefectures over the next four years) and ended between 24 July 2011 and 31 March 2012 (when all analog transmissions were shut down).
 : Early DTT broadcasts were rolled out in January 2014 starting in selected test areas, while full nationwide coverage to an estimated 98% populated areas was expected by the end of the analogue-digital simulcast period. The official launch of digital broadcasts was on 6 June 2017 by the Prime Minister with an estimation of 4.2 million digital television decoders were to be given free to citizens, including recipients of the government aid of 1Malaysia People's Aid (BR1M). The Malaysian Communications and Multimedia Ministry (MCMM) further stated that analogue broadcasting throughout Malaysia would be turned off completely in September 2019 with full digital television broadcasting available by October. Langkawi was the first area to commence the digital switchover on 21 July 2019 at 02:30 am (UTC+8). Later, on 6 August 2019, MCMM released the complete list of transition date on the remaining areas. The Malaysian Communications and Multimedia Commission (MCMC) announced in late September that the full digital transition was to be completed on 31 October 2019. The switchover was scheduled with central and southern West Malaysia on 30 September, northern and eastern coasts of West Malaysia on 14 October and entire East Malaysia on 31 October. The digital transition in West Malaysia was completed on 15 October 2019 at 12:30 am with East Malaysia later on 31 October 2019 also at 12:30 am.

 : The country selected the standard of DVB-T2 with first launch in 2014. Full transition to digital terrestrial television broadcasting were completed in 2015.
 : In June 2012, the Media Development Authority (MDA) announced that it had adopted DVB-T2. Government-owned Mediacorp (which holds a monopoly on terrestrial television) stated that it planned to launch digital feeds of its seven channels, with some in HD, by the end of 2013. In January 2016, Minister for Communications and Information Yaacob Ibrahim established a goal for an analogue shutdown by the end of 2017. In November 2017, the deadline was pushed back to the end of 2018, citing concerns over the number of low-income families that had participated in the government's subsidy program.  Analogue broadcasts of Mediacorp channels ended shortly after midnight on 2 January 2019.
 : Digital switchover progressed region–by–region, with the first analog transmitters in Uljin, North Gyeongsang Province ending transmissions on Wednesday, 1 September 2010. All analog broadcastings officially full-time completely turn off on New Year's Eve (31 December) 2012 at 03:59:59 KST (UTC+9) for all nationwide (including Seoul Capital Area such as Seoul, Gyeonggi Province and Incheon) so all analog broadcastings officially full-time completely turn off on same time. On New Year's Eve (31 December) 2012 at 04:00:00 KST (UTC+9), the digital terrestrial television of the South Korea fully turned, shifted and switched to all full ultra high definition for all nationwide (including Seoul Capital Area such as Seoul, Gyeonggi Province and Incheon).
 : Digital television launched terrestrially throughout Taiwan on 2 July 2004 with the country selected the DVB-T2 standard. Analogue terrestrial television ended transmission on 30 June 2012 while the shut down of analogue cable television was underway.
 : The Thai National Broadcasting and Telecommunications Commission (NBTC) and broadcasters conducted a field trial for digital terrestrial transmission of DVB-T2 in Bangkok area in 2013. The following year, digital terrestrial television began to be launched. Analogue signals switch off started in 2017 for some channels before the rest which was fully completed in 2020. By 2018, rural areas in Thailand saw the transition from analogue to digital. By September 2018, Channel 3 (owned by BEC and MCOT) was the last broadcaster to offer analogue services; it completely changed to digital in late 2019 on VHF while the one on UHF ended to broadcast on analogue TV on 25 March 2020 at 11:57 pm (UTC+7).

 : The country launched DVB-T tests in 2002 and it was rolled out nationwide in 2005. On 27 December 2011, Prime Minister Nguyễn Tấn Dũng issued Decree No. 2451/QD-TTg approving the country television project of "Digitisation of terrestrial television transmission and broadcasting in 2020" (also called as the Project of Digitisation of Television) which prescribes that before 31 December 2020, analogue television broadcasting in 63 Vietnam provinces and cities would be switched to digital terrestrial television under the DVB-T2 system. Analogue signals first switched-off on 1 November 2015 and complete migration into digital television began taking place from 30 November 2020 before the final analogue shutdown being announced the following month by the country Prime Minister on 31 December. Since January 2020, a total of 1.3 million digital television receivers for both poor and near-poor households were provided directly by Vietnam's public utility telecommunications service provision of the Ministry of Information and Communications in 48 provinces and cities under the television digitisation programme of the central government. By 30 June, a total of 21 provinces had indefinitely stop broadcasting analogue and migrate into digital broadcasting. The transition on the remaining 15 provinces was finally completed at 12:00 am (UTC+7) on 28 December 2020, four days earlier before the final date prescribes by the Prime Minister within the last year of 2020.

Oceania
  Complied with the FCC transition to ATSC digital on 12 June 2009 on all full-power stations.
 : Digital television commenced in Australia's five most populous cities on Monday 1 January 2001. The Mildura region was the first to terminate its analog network, on Wednesday 30 June 2010. Digital switchover was originally expected to be complete by Tuesday 31 December 2013, however, the last regions to switch over (Melbourne and Remote Eastern/Central Australia) did so slightly earlier, on Tuesday 10 December 2013 at 9:00 am. Until the switch-off in the respective areas, free-to-air stations were simulcast, along with digital-only channels like ABC TV Plus. Cable television networks began simulcasting in 2004 and analog cable services were switched off in April 2007. The switchover was co-ordinated by the Digital Switchover Taskforce operating under the federal Department of Broadband, Communications and the Digital Economy.
 : Complied with the FCC transition to digital on 12 June 2009 on all full-power stations.
 : FSMTC (FSM Telecommunications Company) provides a subscription based digital over the air (DVB-T) service to Kosrae, Chuuk and Yap.  This provides various international television channels and a local information channel.  No local television broadcasters operate in FSM.
  Complied with the FCC transition to ATSC digital on 12 June 2009 on all full-power stations.
 : Digital terrestrial television broadcasts began officially in April 2008. analog PAL switchoff started on 30 September 2012 with the North Island's Hawke's Bay region and the South Island's West Coast region and finished with the Upper North Island which was switched off 1 December 2013.

Transitions in progress

ITU region 1

Africa
 Trials using the ISDB-T standard were tested in 2011. Later in 2013 the state decided to use DVB-T2 instead, with a launch date for 2017. However this was reviewed once again and in 2019 Angola picked ISDB-T to be the standard for its future DTT network. The process began in 2020 with the aim of being complete by 2025–28.
  began digital broadcasts in 2008, using ISDB-T. Analogue signals were to be terminated in 2024. However, Botswana changed the date to 28 February 2022.
  has been in transition to digital as of 2018. No completion date yet.
  has been in transition to digital as of 2018. No completion date yet.
  DTT broadcasts launched on 30 April 2014 and it was expected to shut analog down at the end of that year. However the transition was not easy and analog remained on air, still as of 2019. No completion date yet.
  is transitioning as of 2015. No completion date yet.
 has introduced digital broadcasts using the DTMB standard. No completion date yet.
 : DTT started trials in December 2016. It was announced in June 2018 that DTT should start in 2019. No completion date yet.
  has been in transition to digital as of 2016. Later in 2018 the state decided to use DVB-T2 instead, with a launch date for 2018.[164] However this was reviewed once again and in 2019 Democratic Republic of the Congo picked ISDB-T to be the standard for its future DTT network.[165] The process began in 2021 with the aim of being complete by 2024–31.
 : Transition is ongoing as of 2020.
  has had DVB-T transmissions for several years as of 2019, with plans to roll out DVB-T2 that year. There is no analog switchoff date yet.
  in 2016 begun its digital switch-over to DVB-T2 with help from American digital transmitter manufacturer GatesAir and funded by JPMorgan Chase and Export Development Canada. According to the government this might finish between 2021 and 2026.
  has been is in transition and aimed to complete analog switch off by 2020.
 : Introduced DTT based on DVB-T in 2014. No completion date yet.
 : The country's regulator authorized TNTSAT Africa to start the transition to digital in 2018. No completion date yet.
 : DTT launched in March 2007. Analogue transmitters on UHF band were switched off on 17 June 2015. Analog transmitters on VHF band were switched off on 17 June 2020.
  began transitioning to DVB-T2 in 2013. The future DVB-T2 and digital televiIon According to the government this might finish between 2025 and reterminated in 2030. Official launch 8 December 2015. No completion date yet.
 : DTT was deployed on 21 September 2018 after 3 years testing. No ASO date yet.
 's switchover to DVB-T2 is ongoing stewarded by GatesAir. The aim was to complete the switchover by December 2021.
  introduced DTT in 2012. No completion date yet.
  Excaf Telecom won the public tender in 2014 to broadcast the country's DVB-T2 DTT network. The analog switch began in September 2019 and continued until 2020.
  has been in transition to digital as of 2018. No completion date yet.
  The Northern Cape became the first province to switch fully to digital in December 2018. It was planned that analog would have been switched off in March 2022. However, in December 2022, Minister Khumbudzo Ntshavheni announced that the analogue television broadcast signal would be switched off on 31 March 2023.
  has been in transition to digital as of 2018. Broadcasting equipment manufacturer Harris Corporation helped to transition Togo to DVB-T2. No completion date yet.

Europe and CIS
 : In February 2018, the DTT service rolled out. No completion date yet.
  With the final analogue satellite broadcasts from TRT ended in February 2006, TRT launched trial digital transmissions in 2006 and originally planned to gradually handle the switchover, with a completion date of March 2015. In 2013 the broadcasting regulator awarded a license to a firm; the award was voided in 2014 after the country's constitutional court upheld a complaint against the process. Although new licenses were proposed in 2018 there was still no DTT network. However, with the construction of a new "digital" transmitter in Küçük Çamlıca TV Radio Tower and Çanakkale TV Tower, digital broadcasts finally began testing in 2020. As of 2020 there are 30+ FTA HD broadcasts with all popular and 5 TRT channels are available by satellite and digital cable. There are plans building up to 40 more transmitters around the country, including the retrofit of Endem TV Tower.
 : All privately owned networks' analog broadcasts were switched off on 1 August 2018 in the Kyiv region, on 1 September 2018 in most parts of the country. The channels of UA:PBC were switched off in September 2018 – January 2019 in most parts of the country. Meanwhile, most channels in Russia-bordering regions, and some local channels (nationwide) that did not yet get the license for digital broadcasting, were still broadcast in analog until 31 December 2020, after which they wee discontinued analog broadcasts. However, in some areas, there are commercial channels staying in analog.

Middle East
 : DVB-T/T2 DTT is operating, including in the Kurdistan Region. No analog switchover date yet.
 : In transition to digital as of 2019. No completion date yet.
 : In transition to DVB-T2, stewarded by GatesAir. Phase 2 of the DTT rollout was finished by May 2017. No analog switch off date yet.
 : The process started in 2012 with the deployment of a DVB-T2 system. No completion date yet.
 : The digital television service (DVB-T) in Syria was restarted since mid-2018, in the provinces of Damascus, Daraa, As Suwayda, Rif Dimashq, Tartus, Latakia, Quneitra and Hama, and there is still no date for an analog disconnect.

ITU region 2 (Americas)
 : In Antigua there is digital television in some territories: Cades Bay, Johnsons Point, Orange Valley, Crab Hill, Urlings and Old Road. There is no date for completion.
 : Digital television broadcasts started on Tuesday, 9 September 2008 in Buenos Aires. The analog network was to be terminated on 1 January 2019, was further postponed until 2021 and was postponed again until 2022.
 : The public broadcaster BCB transitioned to digital in September 2016. No completion date yet.
 : The President of the Authority for the Regulation and Control of Telecommunications and Transport (ATT), Roy Méndez, said that in November 2019, analogue switch-off took place in La Paz, El Alto, Cochabamba and Santa Cruz with no date for everywhere else nationwide.

 : Began free-to-air HD digital transmissions, after a period of test broadcasts, on Sunday, 2 December 2007 in São Paulo, expanding in 2008 to Brasília, Rio de Janeiro, and Belo Horizonte. Digital broadcasts were phased into the other 23 state capitals in the following years, and to the remaining cities by Tuesday 31 December 2013. The country started on 1 March 2016 in Rio Verde, Goiás as a pilot experiment, followed by the Federal District and main cities and metropolitan regions from 17 November 2016 to 2020. The transition was completed in most of the country on 9 January 2019; analog signals in the country's remaining rural areas are expected to switch off in 2023.
 : Broadcaster Cayman 27 announced that it started broadcasting digitally on ATSC in 2012. No completion date yet.
 : The transition to digital started in 2012. ASO was delayed and was now set to be 2024.
: Tenders started in July 2019. No completion date yet.
 : Digital television broadcasts started on Monday, 20 September 2010. The government planned to close down analog broadcast on 31 December 2019, but it was postponed until 2021
  began to propose DVB-T in May 2009. However, Cuba opted for the Chinese DTMB standard and began tests in 2013, with new digital transmitters being rolled out and a shutoff date in 2021.
 : Started DTT broadcasts based on DVB-T in 2009. No date yet when to switch off the older NTSC analog broadcasts.
 : The Dominican Government once set a final analog shut down date of all analog transmissions on 24 September 2015. However, INDOTEL, a telecommunications department of the Dominican Government, postponed it to 9 August 2021. 
 : The analog switch off was delayed several times. In September 2018 the telecom ministry said that the first phase would start in May 2020 starting in Quito where it finished and it continues until December 2023.
 : Began on 21 December 2018, and it was completed in 2022.
 : Expected to begin in 2022 and to be completed by 2023. Jamaica converts to ATSC 3.0. Television Jamaica launched ATSC 3.0 broadcasts on 31 January 2022, at 6:30 PM local time.
 : Analog TV sets are no longer allowed to be sold since 11 June 2018, unless provided with a free DVB-T converter box. Since 11 December 2018, no analog TV sets may be sold, even if provided with a free converter box; This deadline was later extended until April 2019. The switchover date was on 1 October 2020 for the provinces of Panamá, Colón, and Panamá Oeste. All other provinces have no switchover date. The switchover date was delayed, being originally planned for 2017. Due to COVID-19 pandemic remote learning measures the switchover date was delayed again, this time until 1 June 2021. In July 2021, the switchover was delayed indefinitely until at least 90% of users have digital TV access, as 41% have access.
 : The transmission of digital television broadcasts started in August 2011, by TV Pública (which belongs to the Paraguayan government) with an initial coverage area of 25 kilometres (about 16 miles) from Asuncion downtown. The analog television system switch-off was taking place in 2020 however on 22 January 2019 La Nación reported the country pushed it back to 2021.
 : Digital television broadcasts started in Lima and Callao (Territory 1) in March 2010, and analog broadcasts were terminated on 20 June 2020; Arequipa, Cusco, Trujillo, Piura and Huancayo (territory 2) started digital transition somewhere between April and June 2018 and analog broadcasts are scheduled to be terminated on 3 January 2023.
 : DVB-T adopted since 2011, and introduced by 2013. No completion date yet.
 : Expected to begin in March 2023 and to be completed by 2026. Trinidad and Tobago will be transitioning to ATSC 3.0.

 : People's Television Network (PTV) launched a digital service in 2010. It uses the UHF band. No completion date yet.
 : Began broadcasting digital television in 2010. The analogue switch-off was planned for 21 November 2015, but was postponed indefinitely with no new switchover date yet.
 : Digital television transmission began in 2007 for the broadcasting of 2007 Copa América. Later on 20 February 2013 transmissions began nationalwide. Analogue was set to be terminated in 2020

ITU region 3

Asia

 : 4 channels of DVB-T2 were launched in Kabul in June 2014. ASO has however been repeatedly delayed. There is no date for the switchover due to the fall of Kabul in 2021.
 : Has adopted DVB-T and tested broadcasts as of 2014. Public broadcaster BTV aimed to make the country digital by 2021, its 50th anniversary of independence.
 : Adopted DVB-T. The original analog switch off date was set to be 2017, although it did not occur.
 : DVB-T2 was launched on Tuesday, 9 November 2010, however by 23 December 2019 the only FTA DVB-T channels appeared to be pay TV channels that the provider erroneously neglected to encrypt. The incumbent FTA channels have thus far not provided DVB-T broadcasts. The Cambodian government pushed ahead its co-operation with China for the digital transition from analogue with China's DTMB system. Full digital transition was estimated by the government to have fully commenced by 2023.
 : Telecom Regulatory Authority of India set the deadlines for the completion of digital transitioning at the end of years with Phase I (Metro cities) by 31 December 2019 and phase II (cities having a population of more than one million) by 31 December 2021. The company also set a deadline for phase III (the rest of India) by 31 December 2023.

 : First digital television broadcasting were commenced in 2009, using the DVB-T MPEG-4 standard, with 40% of population having access to digital TV by mid-2011. There is no deadline yet for converting analog signals to digital.
 : Adopted the DTMB standard as Mainland China and Hong Kong in 2008. There is no deadline yet for converting analog signals to digital.
: Digital broadcasts launched in 2013. The switchover date was set to be December 2020.
 : Digital terrestrial broadcasts launched in 2018. That same year, analog cable television was shut in the capital Kathmandu. Analog terrestrial television broadcasts will be shut off in 2024.
 : In 2015, Pakistan inaugurated the adoption of the DTMB standard for the country digital television broadcasts in an event jointly officiated by Chinese Communist Party general secretary Xi Jinping and Pakistani Prime Minister Nawaz Sharif. The first DTMB services were then tested with the signing of a memorandum of understanding (MoU) between Pakistani Ministry of Information and Broadcasting and China's National Development and Reform Commission. A pilot project was successfully completed in 2018 for $2 million. It was expected that the system would roll out to the public in 2020. 
 : In June 2010, the National Telecommunications Commission set a deadline of 11:59 p.m. on 31 December 2015 for the discontinuation of analog television. However, since the last quarter of 2014, the digitization deadline was postponed to 2019 and should be expected that all remaining analog broadcasts are shut off in 2023. ABS-CBN was the first channel to transition to digital test broadcasts through its digital TV box ABS-CBN TV Plus. However their digital broadcasts were ceased on 30 June 2020 due to cease and desist order released by National Telecommunications Commission due to their expired broadcasting franchise on 4 May 2020. ZOE Broadcasting Network's DZOZ-TV became the first TV station in the country to permanently cease analog terrestrial operations on 28 February 2017, signaling the start of the country's transition to digital-only broadcasting. Digital television in the Philippines uses the Japanese ISDB standards for its terrestrial digital broadcast.

Oceania
  Introduced its DVB-T2 digital terrestrial service called Walesi in testing phase 2016 and rolled out to public in December 2017. Switchover was planned to start in 2020. No completion date yet.
  DTT in DVB-T2 form was introduced with help from Papua New Guinea in 2018, first rolling out in the main island Tarawa. No completion date yet.
  Introduced DVB-T2. No switchover date yet.
  Introduced DTT publicly in 2019. No completion date yet.
 : Currently in transition. TTV broadcasts digital TV in DVB-T and T2. However satellite is dominant in most of the country. No completion date yet.
 Started transition in 2015. No completion date yet.
  The main public channel made the switch to digital in October 2016. No completion date yet.

Transitions not yet started or planned

ITU region 1

Africa
 : Deployment of DTT has been planned as of 2017 together with StarTimes. Government announced that year to accelerate the process.
 The transition has still been planned as of 2018.
 : A June 2018 meeting confirmed that a digital migration would start.
 : The government partnered with StarTimes to create a DTT network.
 As of 2017, the country has been "optimistic" to start DTT broadcasts with help from the Chinese state's StarTimes.
  planned in 2014 to make a transition to digital. StarTimes has taken over the DTT process.
 : In June 2013, the country signed a deal with the Chinese StarTimes to manage a migration to digital TV. However the process has been slow and there is still no DTT operating as of 2017.
 : A switchover to digital TV was part of the government's 2012–2016 National Development Plan. However it missed the international 2015 deadline to launch its DTT network.
  The state broadcaster SSBC has expressed interest in DVB-T2, but no budget has been allocated for the project.
  The DTT project started in 2015. However digital transmission has still not been rolled out as of 2019, mainly because of budgetary issues. The government has still been committed to make the switchover.

Europe and CIS
 : The telecom chairman Lasha Shamba said in 2019 that there was a project in managing a digital switch but that the territory was not ready yet due to lack of funding. The analog switch off in Russia proved to cause problems for Abkhazians who have watched Russian relay terrestrial broadcasts in analog.
 : There was a DVB-T service launched in 2015 but it was not available on all parts of the country. Currently there is no date for the switchover.
 : The government published a plan for a switchover in 2015. As of 2019 however, there is no DTT network in operation yet.
: DTT has not yet rolled out in the territory. Its creation has been postponed due to lack of funds.
 : The country adopted DVB-T2 in 2014. The government planned to start transitioning in 2015, although this has not occurred as of yet. The exclusion of private broadcasters and stakeholders is one of the reasons for the delay.

Middle East
 : In January 2015 a pilot project on DTT was launched from Télé Liban broadcasting sites. The service has not yet publicly rolled out.
 : A digital switchover has been planned by the Palestinian Authority as of 2013, although its rollout has been delayed.

ITU region 2 (Americas)
 : As of 2012, public broadcaster CBC chose the ATSC standard for its future DTT network.
  has not yet introduced DTT. Head of broadcasting division Ilham Ghazi and telecom director Justin Barrow said in September 2018 that a switchover has not been planned as extra spectrum space was not demanded.
 : Digital switchover still being planned as of 2014.
 started testing ISDB-T broadcasts in December 2017, with the aim of rolling out the services soon and an analog switch off date of 2022.
  made a roadmap to a transition between 2014 and 2017. The DTT network has not yet rolled out.
 : DTT made its experimental launch in December 2016, using the ATSC standard.
 chose the ISDB-T standard in 2015. The first DTT trials began in March 2018.
 : No DTT has currently been planned in Saint Lucia. Analogue cable transmissions were shut during 2013.

ITU region 3

Asia
 : Lao National Television joined China's Yunnan Digital TV Company to establish Lao Digital TV with DTMB system in 2007. Lao Deputy Minister of Information, Culture and Tourism Savankhone Razmountry further state that their country was making every effort to fully switch from the analogue television system to DTMB by 2020.
 : In 2015 the Maldives picked the ISDB-T standard for its DTT network. The service has yet to roll out.
 : It was reported in 2013 that North Korea had tested digital broadcasting trials in 2012. DVB-T2 was adopted as digital terrestrial television broadcast standard On 19 January 2015, Korean Central Television, the country's state broadcaster, began broadcasting via digital satellite. However, there is no confirmed plan yet to introduce digital terrestrial broadcasts.
 : Television industry in Sri Lanka had been prepared to digitalise itself for more than half a decade but government policy of uncertainties have confused broadcasters and caused many delays. A 2014 television digitisation deal between Sri Lankan previous government and Japan are delayed up until present. In 2018, a Sri Lankan company named Television and Radio Network (TRN) offered to launch nationwide free digital television switch using the DVB-T2 system in contrast to Japanese proposal of ISDB-T system.
 : On 11 December 2018, the Timor-Leste cabinet gaven Secretary of State for Social Communication Merício Juvenal dos Reis permission to sign a Sino-Timor-Leste agreement for the introduction of Chinese digital television format of DTMB into the country. On 18 June 2019, the groundbreaking ceremony for the China-aided demonstration project of the DTMB was held at the China Radio and Television Station in Timor-Leste. The work subsequently began on 21 June.

Oceania
 : As of 2014, the country has planned to create and migrate to digital terrestrial TV.
: Plans were made in 2016 by the BCN to make a future switch to digital broadcasting. 
 : The country has digital cable broadcasts.

No information available

See also
 Autoroll
 Digital dividend after digital television transition
 Digital television
 List of digital television deployments by country

References

Further reading

External links
 EU Switchover from analog to digital broadcasting
 Digital Switchover UK
 Handbook on Analog Switch Off (ASO, 2008) at Digital Television Action Group (DigiTAG)

2000s in technology
2000s in television
2010s in technology
2010s in television
Digital television
Technological phase-outs